Gangsta Girls (Vietnamese: Nữ tướng cướp) is a 2004 Vietnamese film. Directed by young director Le Hoang, it was the most financially successful film in Vietnam during 2005. It stars Lam Truong, Bang Lang and My Duyen. The film is distributed by Thien Ngan Galaxy

Plot
Two poor sisters (played by top list models My Duyen and Bang Lang), living in a slum area in Ho Chi Minh City have found a malicious way to get money, usually by acting disabled. After they trick a man and put him to sleep they steal all his belongings and money. The sisters decide to go out to a fancy restaurant, and soon, meet the young owner. The younger sister eventually falls in love with him, even though the two sisters decided to kidnap him for ransom. In the end karma finds the sisters.

2004 films
2004 in Vietnam
2004 crime drama films
Vietnamese crime films
Vietnamese drama films